A bypass is a road or highway that avoids or "bypasses" a built-up area, town, or village, to let through traffic flow without interference from local traffic, to reduce congestion in the built-up area, and to improve road safety. A bypass specifically designated for trucks may be called a truck route.

If there are no strong land use controls, buildings are often built in town along a bypass, converting it into an ordinary town road, and the bypass may eventually become as congested as the local streets it was intended to avoid. Petrol stations, shopping centres and some other businesses are often built there for ease of access, while homes are often avoided for noise and pollution reasons.

Bypass routes are often controversial, as they require the building of a road carrying heavy traffic where no road previously existed. This creates a conflict between those who support a bypass to reduce congestion in a built up area, and those who oppose the development of (often rural) undeveloped land. However, some of those in the bypassed city may also oppose the project, because of the potential reduction in city-centre business.

Canada
In Ontario, examples include the Donald Cousens Parkway (formerly named the Markham Bypass from 2004-2006) and the Box Grove Bypass in the city of Markham; and in Toronto a section of Highway 401 was called the Toronto Bypass in the 1950s when the highway was built as a bypass of Highway 2, Ontario Highway 2A which was built to bypass Highway 2 between Toronto and Newcastle, and the Caledonia Bypass, a section of Highway 6 in Caledonia.

In Nova Scotia, the section of Highway 104 between Thomson Station and Masstown is colloquially named the Cobequid Pass; this name is for a section of road that bypasses the Wentworth Valley by crossing the Cobequid Mountains.

United Kingdom

The idea of bypasses predates the use of motor vehicles. The first (northern) London bypass, the present Marylebone Road between Paddington and Islington, was started in 1756.

Bypasses can take many years to gain planning approval and funding. Many towns and villages have been campaigning for bypasses for over 30 years e.g. Banwell in North Somerset.

There was large-scale protest during construction of the Newbury bypass—officially known as the Winchester–Preston Trunk Road (A34) (Newbury Bypass)—a  stretch of dual carriageway which bypasses the town of Newbury in Berkshire, England. The protest was popularly known as the Third Battle of Newbury, a name which was also adopted by one of the main protest groups. The name was chosen in reference to the First Battle of Newbury of 1643 and the Second Battle of Newbury of 1644, both of which took place close to the town during the English Civil War.

United States

In the United States, bypass routes are a type of special route used on an alternative routing of a highway around a town when the main route of the highway goes through the town. The original designation of these routes were "truck routes" to divert through truck traffic away from the town, but the designation was changed to "bypass" in 1959 by AASHTO. However, many "truck" routes remain where the mainline of the highway is prohibited for trucks.

In a few cases, both a bypass and a business route exist, each with auxiliary signs (e.g. U.S. Route 60 in Lexington, Kentucky). Bypass routes are less common than business routes. Many of those that existed before the era of Interstate Highways have lost their old designations. For example, in Missouri, the old bypass route of U.S. Route 71 to the east of Kansas City, Missouri was decommissioned as Interstate 435 supplanted it; the remainder that existed as suburban surface route became Missouri Route 291. Around St. Louis, Missouri, what had been U.S. Route 50 Bypass was absorbed into a diversion of U.S. Route 50 from Interstate 44 and Interstate 64.

In the Interstate Highway System in the United States, primary routes are designated with a one- or two-digit number, while bypasses and loops are generally designated with a three-digit number beginning with an even digit. However, there are many exceptions to this convention, where routes with three-digit numbers serve the main route through town while the routes with one- or two-digit numbers serve as the bypass.  A few such examples can be found in the metropolitan areas of Des Moines, Iowa (Interstate 235 goes through downtown, while Interstate 35 and Interstate 80 bypass downtown), Omaha, Nebraska (Interstate 480 traverses the downtown area, while Interstate 80 is one of the bypasses), and Pittsburgh, Pennsylvania (the city is served by Interstate 279 and Interstate 376, while Interstate 70, Interstate 76, and Interstate 79 all bypass city limits).

Another meaning of the term bypass route (usually simply called a bypass) is a highway that was constructed to bypass an area that is often congested with traffic. This includes Interstate Highway beltways and U.S. Highways constructed to circumvent downtown areas. Examples of these are U.S. Route 60 bypassing Williamsburg, Virginia, Interstate 285 bypassing Downtown Atlanta, U.S. Route 20/U.S. Route 31 bypassing metro South Bend, Indiana (on the St. Joseph Valley Parkway), and Interstate 75 bypassing Tampa and St. Petersburg, Florida. These bypasses usually carry mainline routes rather than auxiliary "bypass" routes.

The first bypass route in the United States was completed in 1958 as Alabama State Route 210 (Ross Clark Circle) in Dothan, Alabama.

Shoofly
In the United States, the term shoofly – a borrowing from railroad jargon – is also sometimes used to refer to a short temporary roadway built to bypass a construction site or other temporary obstruction.  The U.S. Manual on Uniform Traffic Control Devices uses the term "diversion".

Brazil

In Brazil the widest and busiest bypasses are located in the state of São Paulo, and many of them intersect and merge around large cities to form ring-like systems. Most notably the Rodoanel Mário Covas, which encircles the city of São Paulo and passes through other cities in the metropolitan area, is the largest project of such type with a planned total length of 180 km upon completion. It is divided into sections and connected to major highways and while not being a toll road itself, accesses to other motorways are often placed through toll booths.

Asia

Hong Kong
Hong Kong contains several bypasses. The first are the Island Eastern Corridor, the East Kowloon Corridor, the West Kowloon Corridor, and the Lung Cheung and Ching Cheung Roads.  Later ones are named directly as bypasses, such as Kwun Tong Bypass, Hung Hom Bypass, and the Ma On Shan Bypass. Other bypasses include the Tai Po Section of the Tolo Highway, the section within the Tuen Mun New Town of the Tuen Mun Road, the Yuen Long Highway, and the West Kowloon Highway. The Central-Wan Chai Bypass, which costs HK$28.1 billion, is a series of tunnels between Central and Causeway Bay.

Japan

Malaysia
Malaysia also contain several bypasses such as Rawang Bypass, Kajang Bypass, Bidor Bypass and Kuala Terengganu Bypass.

Philippines

Bypass roads (or in other cases "diversion roads") in the Philippines are generally considered on national highways passing through a densely populated city or municipality. Local governments usually promote construction of bypasses where the existing highway becomes heavily congested. Bypasses are common in rural municipalities to deter through traffic from entering the poblacion or town centre. Careful planning is considered when planning a bypass through a community to ensure the original route is downgraded to local access. Control of access to properties is taken in account to avoid uncontrolled land development.

Bypass road signs around the world

See also 

Special route
Alternate route
Business route
Link road
List of special routes of the United States Numbered Highway System
List of business routes of the Interstate Highway System
Ring road
National Highway No. 3 (Taiwan)

References